The 2015–16 Chicago State Cougars men's basketball team represented Chicago State University during the 2015–16 NCAA Division I men's basketball season. The Cougars, led by sixth year head coach Tracy Dildy, played their home games at the Emil and Patricia Jones Convocation Center and were members of the Western Athletic Conference. They finished the season 4–28, 0–14 in WAC play to finish in last place. They lost in the quarterfinals of the WAC tournament to Cal State Bakersfield.

Previous season
The Cougars finished the season 8–24, 4–10 in WAC play to finish in a tie for seventh place. They lost in the quarterfinals of the WAC tournament to Seattle.

Departures

Incoming Transfers

2015 incoming recruits

Roster

Schedule and results

|-
!colspan=9 style="background:#28372F; color:#FFFFFF;"| Regular season

|-
!colspan=9 style="background:#28372F; color:#FFFFFF;"| WAC tournament

References

Chicago State Cougars men's basketball seasons
Chicago State